The Holly Springs Salamanders are an amateur baseball team in the Coastal Plain League, collegiate summer baseball league. The team plays its home games at Ting Stadium in Holly Springs, North Carolina. The Salamanders are coached by Eric Sibrizzi.

History
The Salamanders play in the East Division with the Edenton Steamers, Morehead City Marlins, Fayetteville Swampdogs, Wilson Tobs, Wilmington Sharks and, Peninsula Pilots. On October 1, 2014, the Salamanders signed their first player, C Joey Roach from Georgia State. The Salamanders finished their inaugural campaign with a 28-28 record, advancing to the playoffs. The Salamanders lost to the eventual Petitt Cup Champions Edenton Steamers in the Divisional Round.

The Salamanders failed to make the playoffs in 2016, finishing the season with a 22-32 record. In 2017, the Salamanders came up short of the playoffs again, finishing with at 26-30 overall record.

The 19th annual Coastal Plain League All-Star Game was held at Ting Stadium July 9–10, 2017, with a crowd of 2,038 on hand to watch the East All-Stars defeat the West All-Stars 2-1. The All-Star Game was broadcast live to over 25 million homes in the United States through a partnership with 7 Communications and MLB.com.

Capitol Broadcasting Company purchased the team in November 2017. Capitol Broadcasting Company also owns the Durham Bulls and WRAL-TV, among other media entities.

Yearly records

Alumni
These former Salamanders have been selected in the MLB Draft:

References

External links
 Holly Springs Salamanders Official Website
 Coastal Plain League

Coastal Plain League
2015 establishments in North Carolina
Baseball teams established in 2015
Sports in Wake County, North Carolina
Amateur baseball teams in North Carolina